Mendiga is a former civil parish in the municipality of Porto de Mós, Portugal. The population in 2011 was 930, in an area of 20.01 km2. It was first mentioned in 1142 but only became a freguesia shortly after 1525. It is home to the multi-sport club ARCD Mendiga. On 28 January 2013 it merged with Arrimal to form Arrimal e Mendiga.

References 

Former parishes of Porto de Mós